The ÍBV men's football team is the men's football department of the ÍBV-íþróttafélag (English: ÍBV sports club) multi-sport club. It is based in Vestmannaeyjar, Iceland, and currently plays in the Besta deild karla, the top-tier men's football league in Iceland. The team plays it home games at the Hásteinsvöllur. It has won the Icelandic championship three times, in 1979, 1997 and 1998.

Achievements
Icelandic Championships: 3
1979, 1997, 1998

Icelandic Cups: 5
1968, 1972, 1981, 1998, 2017

Icelandic League Cup: 1
1997
Source:

European record

Players

Current squad

Notable players
Players who have played for ÍBV and have more than one international cap for their country.

  David James
  Allan Mørkøre
  Baldur Bragason
  Einar Þór Daníelsson
  Arnljótur Davíðsson
  Friðrik Friðriksson
  Tryggvi Guðmundsson
  Heimir Hallgrímsson
  Hermann Hreiðarsson
  Ívar Ingimarsson
  Birkir Kristinsson
  Guðgeir Leifsson
  Sigurvin Ólafsson
  Örn Óskarsson
  Tómas Pálsson
  Ásgeir Sigurvinsson
  Ólafur Sigurvinsson
  Rútur Snorrason
  Hlynur Stefánsson
  Sverrir Sverrisson
  Sigurlás Þorleifsson
  Gunnar Heiðar Þorvaldsson
  Tómas Ingi Tómasson
  David Moyes
  Abel Dhaira
  Tony Mawejje
  Andrew Mwesigwa

Managers

 Heimir Hallgrímsson (Aug 1, 2006–Dec 31, 2010)
 Magnús Gylfason (Jan 1, 2012–Sept 19, 2012)
 Dragan Kažić (Sept 20, 2012–Dec 31, 2012)
 Hermann Hreiðarsson (Jan 1, 2013–Oct 3, 2013)
 Sigurður Ragnar Eyjólfsson (2014)
 Jóhannes Harðarson (Jan 1, 2015–June 24, 2015)
 Sigurður Ragnar Eyjólfsson (July 22, 2015–Oct 3, 2015)
 Bjarni Jóhannsson (Oct 9, 2015–Aug 19, 2016)
 Kristján Guðmundsson (Oct 15, 2016–Sept 29, 2018)
 Pedro Hipólito (Sept 29, 2018–June 30, 2019)
 Helgi Sigurðsson (Oct 1, 2019–)

References

External links
  
 IcelandFootball.net - ÍBV Vestmannaeyjar 

Football clubs in Iceland
Association football clubs established in 1903
1903 establishments in Iceland
Íþróttabandalag Vestmannaeyja